"Wives and Lovers" is a 1963 song by Burt Bacharach and Hal David. It has been recorded by numerous male and female vocalists, instrumentalists and ensembles, most notably by Jack Jones in 1963.  That recording earned the 1964 Grammy Award for Best Vocal Performance, Male, and peaked at number fourteen on the Hot 100 and number nine on the Easy Listening chart.

"Wives and Lovers" is a song of advice to married women, to stay attractive and attentive to their husbands ("wives should always be lovers, too") to avoid their husbands straying with "girls at the office". In the first line, the everywoman wife is addressed "Hey little girl", before a "warning" to "fix your make up" and "run to his [i.e., her husband's] arms the moment he comes home to you." The song originated when Bacharach and David were asked to write a song with the title "Wives and Lovers", on the theme of marital infidelity, as a promotional tie-in for the 1963 film Wives and Lovers. The song did not appear in the film but was intended simply to promote the film; which made it what was known at the time as an "exploitation song".  Similarly, the song "(The Man Who Shot) Liberty Valance", which Bacharach and David wrote in 1962, promoted, but was not featured in, the film The Man Who Shot Liberty Valance.

Other versions

 Burt Bacharach recorded "Wives and Lovers" with orchestra and chorus and released the song as single B-side of "Trains and Boats and Planes" in 1965 on London Records and included it on the album Hit Maker! Burt Bacharach Plays the Burt Bacharach Hits (London and Kapp) of the same year (and later compilations).
 Bacharach and David produced their version with Dionne Warwick in 1963Ref? for Scepter (licensed to British Pye and French Vogue, both releasing the title on 7" EPs, each with four different songs). This version of the song was featured in the 1965 album The Sensitive Sound of Dionne Warwick (Scepter).
 Vic Damone version was released as single in 1963; B-side was "Oooh! Look-A There Ain't She Pretty?" (Capitol)
 Dick van Dyke with the Ray Charles Singers and Enoch Light and His Orchestra – Songs I Like (Command, 1963)
 Jack Jones' 1963 single on Kapp Records earned him a Grammy Award for Best Vocal Performance. Jones was accompanied by an orchestra directed by Pete King; the B-side was "Toys in the Attic." In 1979, he released a disco version of the song on the LP Nobody Does It Better (MGM).
 Andy Williams – The Wonderful World of Andy Williams (Columbia, 1963). Andy also performed the song live with Burt Bacharach, his orchestra & chorus as part of a medley of Burt's songs on The Andy Williams Show on April 28, 1968.
 Billy Eckstine - The Modern Sound of Mr. B, a 7" single with 33rpm comprising six songs (Mercury, 1964) 
 Red Holloway with the Brother Jack McDuff Quartet had a single release of the song in (Prestige, 1964)
 Julie London on her self-titled 1964 album (Liberty)
 Peter Nero - Reflections (RCA Victor, 1964)
 Wayne Newton - Sings Hit Songs (Capitol, 1964)
 Frank Sinatra with Count Basie and His Orchestra – It Might as Well Be Swing (Reprise, 1964) While the song was in 3/4 time, the performance was in 4/4 time; according to Bacharach, the record's producer Quincy Jones said "the Basie band can’t play in 3/4."
 Jimmy Smith – Who's Afraid of Virginia Woolf? (Verve, 1964) 
 Nancy Wilson – Today, Tomorrow, Forever, a double single issued by Capitol in 1964 with arrangements by Kenny Dennis. This version is featured on the 2004 label compilation Blue Note Plays Burt Bacharach. 
 Grant Green recorded the song in 1965, but was not released until 1990 as a bonus track on the CD reissue of Matador (Blue Note).
 Ella Fitzgerald with Duke Ellington and His Orchestra recorded the song live at the Côte d'Azur in 1966 (Verve).
 Lena Horne – Lena in Hollywood (United Artists, 1966)
 Thad Jones/Pepper Adams Quintet - On their 1966 album "Mean What You Say" (Milestone)
 Steve Lawrence recorded a version in 1966 (Columbia) 
 Stan Getz – What the World Needs Now – Stan Getz Plays Bacharach and David (Verve, 1968)
 Rita Reys Meets Oliver Nelson recording "Wives and Lovers" and "Satin Doll", released as single on the occasion of the 40th anniversary of the Dutch Youth Hostel Association in 1968.
 Frank Chacksfield and His Orchestra – Chacksfield Plays Bacharach (London, 1970)
 Obscure Christopher Scott's Moog Plays Switched-On Bacharach  for Decca Records in 1969, exploiting Wendy Carlos' success with her interpretations of Johann Sebastian Bach on the Moog synthesizer in 1968 (Switched-On Bach on Columbia).
 Mark Laub and the Music Minus One Orchestra - Bacharach Organized – Music Minus One Organ, arranged and conducted by Jack Six (Music Minus One, 1969).  
 Jack Six – Bacharach Revisited – 10 Backgrounds for Male Singers (Music Minus One, 1969)
 British organist Ena Baga included the song on Happy Hammond Plays Bacharach (Hallmark, 1972).
 Arthur Fiedler and the Boston Pops – What the World Needs Now (The Burt Bacharach-Hal David Songbook) (Polydor, 1972) 
 Ron Goodwin & His Orchestra – Play Burt Bacharach (EMI, 1972)
 Kimiko Itoh – Standards My Way (Video Arts, 1996)
 Jazz trumpeter Dave Douglas arranged the song for a Burt Bacharach tribute compilation on John Zorn's Tzadik label series Great Jewish Music in 1997 with pianist Uri Caine and reed player Scott Robinson.
 Tony Hadley – Passing Strangers (Curb, 2006)
 Patty Ascher – Tribute in Bossa to Burt Bacharach (Just Entertainment, 2010)
 Michelle Dowdy - A Brass Act (Walker Records, 2014)
 Cécile McLorin Salvant - For One to Love (Mack Avenue Records, 2015)
 Laura Benanti - Laura Benanti (2020)
 Rumer - B Sides & Rarities (2022)
 The Skip Heller Trio - "Out of Time: Live in Philly" (2005)

Song in popular culture
The song is featured playing on a radio in the very first "For Better or For Worse" comic strip by Lynn Johnston.
The Jack Jones recording plays in the movie Goodfellas as Karen shows off her new house to Belle Kessler.
Dionne Warwick's version of the song was played during the opening credits of The First Wives Club.
The Blue Devils Drum and Bugle Corps performed "Wives and Lovers" along with other music by Burt Bacharach in their 2011 production entitled The Beat My Heart Skipped. Blue Devils received a score of 97.800 and 2nd place.

References

1963 singles
Songs with lyrics by Hal David
Songs with music by Burt Bacharach
Andy Williams songs
Grammy Award for Best Male Pop Vocal Performance
1963 songs
Songs about marriage